The following is a list of all people who have lost over US$50 billion of net personal wealth in a one year period:

See also 

 List of centibillionaires
 List of largest corporate profits and losses
 List of trading losses

References 

Lists of people by wealth
Economy-related lists of superlatives